Lagoa da Fajã dos Cubres is a lagoon located in the parish of Ribeira Seca, on the north coast of the Portuguese island of São Jorge. The lagoon was listed along with Lagoa da Caldeira as a "Wetland of International Importance" under the Ramsar Convention in 2005. The term fajã refers to the plain areas created from landslides of the abrupt coastal cliffs.

References

Ramsar sites in Portugal
São Jorge Island